The 1976 Copa Simón Bolívar (English: Simon Bolivar Cup) was an international football competition organized by the Venezuelan Football Federation. The idea of this competition was to create a tournament among the champions clubs of the countries liberated by Simon Bolivar. It was played six times from its first edition in 1970 to the last in 1976, thus integrating the league champions clubs of Venezuela, Colombia, Peru, Ecuador and Bolivia. Due to its format, it was a historical precedent of the Copa Merconorte, played between the same Bolivarian countries or the Andean Community from 1998 until the 2001 edition.

Alianza Lima won the competition defeating Portuguesa 2–0 in the Third Round.

Teams

Standings

First round

Second round

Third round

See also
International club competition records
Copa Merconorte
Copa Mercosur
Torneio Mercosul
CONMEBOL Cup

References

Football competitions in Venezuela